Pseudopostega tenuifurcata is a moth of the family Opostegidae. It was described by Donald R. Davis and Jonas R. Stonis, 2007. It is known from a lowland rainforest area in north-eastern Costa Rica

The length of the forewings is 2.3–2.5 mm. Adults have been recorded from January to May.

Etymology
The species name is derived from the Latin tenuis (meaning thin, slender) and furcatus (meaning forked) in reference to the diagnostic attenuated, furcate structure of the caudal lobe of the male gnathos.

References

Opostegidae
Moths described in 2007